Cholargos, also known as Holargos on signage, is a station on Athens Metro Line 3, located 22 metres below Mesogeion Avenue. The station opened on 23 July 2010.

Station layout

References

2010 establishments in Greece
Railway stations opened in 2010
Athens Metro stations